Fredrick "T.J." Smith (born April 19, 1997) is an American football nose tackle for the Minnesota Vikings of the National Football League (NFL).

Early years
Smith was born in Moultrie, Georgia to Frederick and Avis Smith. Smith originally attended North Stanly High School, where he was all-state for North Carolina high school football. Leading into his senior year, Smith transferred to Colquitt County High School. He helped Colquitt County win the state title in their respective region.

College career
Rated as the 142nd best player in the nation by ESPN, Smith chose to attend Arkansas after changing his original commitment to Vanderbilt. Smith redshirted his freshman year and in his redshirt freshman year, Smith only played in five games and had minimal statistics. In his sophomore year, Smith started all twelve games and improved his tackle amount from four in the year prior to twenty-six. In his junior year, Smith once again played in all twelve games. Smith's contributions in his Junior year helped Arkansas tally a team total of 882 tackles that year. In his senior and final year, Smith for a third time started all twelve games, although his tackle amount decreased from the previous two years.

Professional career

Los Angeles Chargers
After going undrafted in the 2020 NFL Draft, Smith was signed by the Los Angeles Chargers as an undrafted free agent. Smith spent the entirety of the 2020 NFL season on the practice squad and was released before the 2021 regular season.

Minnesota Vikings
Midway through the 2021 NFL season, the Minnesota Vikings signed Smith to their practice squad. Smith was then elevated to the active roster before the week 12 game against the San Francisco 49ers. He signed a reserve/future contract with the Vikings on January 10, 2022. He was waived on August 30, 2022, and re-signed to the practice squad the next day. He signed a reserve/future contract on January 20, 2023.

References

External links
Minnesota Vikings bio
Arkansas Razorbacks bio

1997 births
Living people
American football defensive tackles
Arkansas Razorbacks football players
Los Angeles Chargers players
Minnesota Vikings players